Elsenhans is a German surname. Notable people with the surname include:

Hartmut Elsenhans (born 1941), German political scientist
Lynn Elsenhans, American businesswoman
Theodor Elsenhans (1862–1918), German psychologist and philosopher

German-language surnames